The Ipswich Fine Art Club Exhibition, 1880 was an art exhibition organised by Ipswich Fine Art Club in Ipswich, Suffolk. It was opened on 13 March 1880. 705 paintings were exhibited and sales amounting to £870 were effected.

Paintings Exhibited
Paintings by the following artists were exhibited:
 Robert Burrows
 John Duvall
 John Moore of Ipswich
 George Thomas Rope
 Isaac Sheppard
 Thomas Smythe
 Henry George Todd

References

History of Ipswich